Oru Iniya Udhayam (A Good Morning) is a 1986 Indian Tamil-language romantic action film, directed by R. Selvam. The film stars Vijayakanth, Amala, V. K. Ramasamy and Vijayakumar. It was released on 13 December 1986.

Plot 

Sakthivel, a village-based ruffian, is recruited by Sekar for a mission and is taught martial arts. Meanwhile, Shakthi falls in love with Anju, but realises that his mission is linked to her.

Cast 
 Vijayakanth as Sakthivel
 Amala as Anju
 V. K. Ramasamy as Jithu
 Vijayakumar as Sekar
 Sivachandran as Siva
 Vennira Aadai Moorthy as Anju's uncle
 Janagaraj as Thavudu
 Super Subbarayan as Subbu
 Thyagu as Tea shop owner
 Kumarimuthu as Tea shop's customer
 Kamala Kamesh as Thavudu's mother
 Major Sundarrajan as Selvam (Guest appearance)
 Prabhu Deva as side dancer

Production 
Oru Iniya Udhayam was directed by R. Selvam and produced by Pandu Cine Arts.

Soundtrack 
The soundtrack was composed by Manoj–Gyan.

Reception 
On 19 December 1986, The Indian Express wrote that while the film had a good start, many scenes looked like they were executed with "lack of imagination", leading to "clichéd situations and loud acting (especially by Sivachandran)". Jayamanmadhan of Kalki panned the film for its story and lack of logic.

References

External links 
 

1980s romantic action films
1980s Tamil-language films
1986 films
Films scored by Manoj–Gyan
Indian romantic action films